Washington Ramón Saldías González (born August 24, 1949) is a Chilean politician. Saldías is also the executive editor of Pichilemu News.

Saldías was elected Councillor of Pichilemu with 870 votes (13.70%) from a total of 6,352 votes in Chilean municipal election of 1996.

Biography
Saldías was born in Santiago, Chile on August 24, 1949. His family moved to Pichilemu in 1950, and he stayed there until 1964.

In 1975, Saldías was hired by La Tercera as Correspondent in Pichilemu for the newspaper. In 1979, he became Governor of the recently founded Cardenal Caro Province. Saldías acquired the rights to edit Periódico Pichilemu (founded in 1944), from January 31, 1986 until 1990. His project remained dormant until January 2000, when he founded Pichilemu News.

References

1949 births
Living people
People from Santiago
Pichilemu City Council members
Chilean newspaper editors